The  New York Giants season was the franchise's 30th season in the National Football League.

Schedule

Standings

See also 
 List of New York Giants seasons

New York Giants seasons
New York Giants
1954 in sports in New York City
1950s in Manhattan
Washington Heights, Manhattan